Boris Jordan (born 2 June 1966) is a Russian-American billionaire businessman, who is the founder and executive chairman of Curaleaf. As of December 2021, his net worth is USD $1.6 billion.

Early life and education 
Jordan was born in Sea Cliff, New York (on Long Island) to Russian emigrant parents. His father, Aleksey Borisovich Jordan , had lived in Yugoslavia and was a graduate of the "Cadet Corps" in 1941. His mother, Maria Alexandrovna Jordan (née Shishkova), whose father was Alexander Tikhonovich Shishkov, graduated from New York University. According to Boris Jordan, his grandfather was the Russian Minister of Provisions under Pyotr Stolypin before the Russian Revolution. Jordan is a grand nephew of Czar Nicholas II's physician Eugene Botkin.

Jordan earned a bachelor's degree in Russian–American Economic Relations from New York University.

Career
Jordan assisted Russia's economic transition to capitalism in the early 1990s, assisting in the launch of the Russian stock market and the privatization of state assets.

From 1992 until 1995, Jordan worked under Bruce Gardner, who was the director of the Russian Center for Privatization under the Government of the Russian Federation, and headed the Moscow subsidiary of the Credit Suisse First Boston bank, which was part of the Mellon empire. At the same time, he was Managing Director of the Moscow office of CS First Boston. Under his tenure, CS First Boston became a leading investment bank in Russia, engaged in privatization, corporate finance and securities trading. He created the Russian Direct Investment Fund.
 
Jordan was a co-founder of Renaissance Capital investment group (founded in 1995), along with New Zealander Stephen Jennings.

On 25 November 1998, billionaire Vladimir Potanin recommended Jordan to be Chairman of Sidanko which Jordan held until February 1999 when he stepped down.

Jordan is the President and CEO of the Sputnik Group Ltd., which he launched in 1998. The Sputnik Group is a diversified holding company, which manages the Sputnik Funds, the largest foreign private-equity funds invested in Russia. The Sputnik Group currently owns proprietary investments in Russian insurance (Renaissance Insurance), forestry, telecommunications and media sectors – as well as a number of investments in foreign companies.

In 1999, he established the Cadet Corps Fund, and is the Fund's president.

In 2001-2003, he was the CEO of the Russian TV channel NTV and also CEO of Gazprom Media, a subsidiary media holding of Gazprom.

Later appointed chief executive of Russia's Gazprom Media as well as general director of its NTV television network, Jordan was forced to resign in early 2003 under political pressure.

He is chairman Curaleaf, an American cannabis company.

Personal life

Boris Jordan and family
Jordan is fluent in English and Russian. In 2011, Jordan, an NYU alumni, established the Jordan Center for the Advanced Study of Russia at NYU. He purchased a penthouse in South Beach, Miami in 2014 for $20 million. He sold it in May 2018 to Cliff Asness, for a record $26 million.

Nicholas Jordan
Jordan's brother, Nicholas Jordan, has an extensive career in Russia related entities and finance. He is fluent in Russian and English. In 1982, he graduated from Boston University with a bachelor's degree majoring in political science and embarked upon a career in finance.

At Deutsche Bank, he was Alfred Koch's banker when Koch was with Gazprom-Media. Nichols Jordan supported his brother during the privatization of Russia. After he co-headed Russian investment at Deutsche Bank spearheading the financial backing of the Kremlin's aims for financing the Gazprom expansion into petroleum, he went to Lehman to re enter the Russian markets in March 2007. He received nearly $7 million to re establish the Lehman Brothers Holdings' Moscow office in 2007 as head of its Russia operations.

In 2015, he left the UBS Group to join Goldman Sachs as the co-CEO of Goldman Russia. In September 2015, he joined Oleg Boyko's Finstar as CEO. From March until October 2018, he was at Big Un Limited.

In January 2019, he joined the boards of Oleg Deripaska's En+ Group and his Rusal.

See also 
 NTV Russia
 Renaissance Capital

Notes

References

General references

External links 
 Profile: Boris Jordan, CNN, April 10, 2001.
 Commanding Heights: an interview with Boris Jordan, PBS, October 3, 2000.
 Jordan: a statist with a US passport, BBC Russia, April 5, 2001 (in Russian).
 An interview with B. Jordan by Elena Lankina, 2002 (in Russian).
 The Sputnik Group: Selected Press.
 EBRD helps found new Russian life insurance company (2004).
 Dossier by Vladimir Pribylovsky (in Russian).

Russian media executives
American chief executives of financial services companies
American people of Russian descent
New York University alumni
Living people
1966 births
American billionaires
Russian billionaires
Russian businesspeople in the United States
People from Sea Cliff, New York